Al-Izdihar Sport Club, is an Iraqi football team based in Al-Najaf, that plays in the Iraq Division Two.

Managerial history
 Emad Salman

See also
 2020–21 Iraq FA Cup

References

External links
 Al-Izdihar SC on Goalzz.com
 Iraq Clubs- Foundation Dates

2004 establishments in Iraq
Association football clubs established in 2004
Football clubs in Najaf